Diplachne fusca, called bearded sprangletop, is a widespread species of grass in the genus Diplachne, native to North America, the Caribbean, South America, Africa, Asia, and Australia, and introduced in Europe, New Zealand and Hawaii, among other places. It prefers to live in salty, wet conditions, such as in salt marshes and shallow depressions.

Subspecies
The following subspecies are currently accepted:

Diplachne fusca subsp. fascicularis (Lam.) P.M.Peterson & N.Snow
Diplachne fusca subsp. fusca
Diplachne fusca subsp. muelleri (Benth.) P.M.Peterson & N.Snow
Diplachne fusca subsp. uninervia (J.Presl) P.M.Peterson & N.Snow

References

Chloridoideae
Plants described in 1817